Tamar Eshel (24 July 1920 – 24 July 2022) was an Israeli diplomat and politician.

Biography
She was born Tamar Finkelstein in London, while her parents were emissaries of the Jewish Agency in England. She returned with them to Mandatory Palestine in 1923. Her mother was a member of the well-known Feinberg and Belkind families and a sister of Avshalom Feinberg. Her father was among the first attorneys in the territory. Upon their return to Palestine they settled in Haifa, where Eshel graduated from the Hebrew Reali School. She went on to study oriental studies at the University of London.

While in London she was active with the Haganah and in the 1940s she headed its immigration office in France.

Diplomatic and political career
Following the establishment of Israel in 1948 she began working in Jerusalem for the Ministry of Foreign Affairs. Eshel represented the ministry in its delegations to the United Nations and held various positions on its behalf in the Prime Minister's Office. In 1968, towards her retirement from the ministry, she was given the title of Ambassador.

In the 1970s Eshel served as a member of Jerusalem City Council and as deputy mayor to Teddy Kollek. She was also head of the Na'amat women's organization, until her election to the Knesset on the Alignment list in 1977. She retained her seat in the 1981 elections and remained in office until the 1984 elections.

Personal life
Eshel died on 24 July 2022, her 102nd birthday.

References

External links
 

1920 births
2022 deaths
British emigrants to Israel
British people of Israeli descent
Jews in Mandatory Palestine
Hebrew Reali School alumni
Alumni of the University of London
Haganah members
Women members of the Knesset
Alignment (Israel) politicians
Members of the 9th Knesset (1977–1981)
Members of the 10th Knesset (1981–1984)
Deputy Mayors of Jerusalem
20th-century Israeli women politicians
Israeli women diplomats
Ambassadors of Israel
Israeli centenarians
Women centenarians
Israeli women ambassadors
Mandatory Palestine expatriates in the United Kingdom
Politicians from London